Thoreau MacDonald (April 21, 1901 at Toronto, Ontario – May 30, 1989 at Toronto) was a Canadian illustrator, graphic and book designer, and artist.

Career
MacDonald was the son of Group of Seven member J. E. H. MacDonald. He was self-taught, but had worked on commercial art with his father, who was famous for his work in design. Thoreau MacDonald was colour blind and as a result he worked primarily in black and white.

MacDonald's contribution was mainly to the history of the area of graphic art in Canada and the United States. As an illustrator, MacDonald worked for Ryerson Press; Dartmouth College in Hanover, New Hampshire; the Canadian Forum magazine for which he designed many covers; and on books in general, including those from his private press. He considered his finest book to be Maria Chapdelaine by Louis Hémon for Macmillan Company (1938). He also designed lettering, and did paintings, watercolours and drawings. His work is found in the National Gallery of Canada in Ottawa, Hart House at the University of Toronto, the Art Gallery of Ontario, and the McMichael Canadian Art Collection among other collections. There was one major exhibition of his work in Canada during his lifetime in 1952 at Museum London (then called the London Public Library and Art Museum). In 1972, he was made an Honorary Life member of the Society of Ontario Naturalists whose cause he considered he had served life-long.

His former home and  garden in Vaughan, Ontario, which he inherited from his father, was donated to the City of Vaughan in 1974. The building and grounds have been restored and are open to the public.

Artworks

References

Footnotes

Citations

Bibliography

External links
 Thoreau MacDonald collection at the National Gallery of Canada
Thoreau and J.E.H. MacDonald fonds at the National Gallery of Canada

1901 births
1989 deaths
Artists from Toronto
Canadian male painters
Canadian people of Scottish descent
Modern painters
20th-century Canadian male artists
20th-century Canadian painters